Tavern Cave, also known as the Taverne-A Cave, is a historic archaeological site located near  St. Albans, Franklin County, Missouri. Meriwether Lewis and William Clark visited Tavern Cave on May 23, 1804 at the beginning of the Lewis and Clark Expedition. The cave includes a petroglyph of either a canoe or a historic flat boat and several 19th century era inscriptions.

It was listed on the National Register of Historic Places in 1970.

References

Archaeological sites on the National Register of Historic Places in Missouri
Buildings and structures in Franklin County, Missouri
National Register of Historic Places in Franklin County, Missouri
Caves of Missouri
Petroglyphs in Missouri